The following is a list of drum corps competing as members of the Drum Corps Associates (DCA).

Member corps 
Source:

World Class members

Open Class members

A Class members

See also 
 List of Drum Corps International member corps
 List of drum corps

References